Hampton Colored School is a historic school for African-American students located at Hampton, Hampton County, South Carolina. It was built in 1929, and is a one-story, front-gable, rectangular, frame building.  It has clapboard siding, a tin roof, exposed rafters, and a brick pier foundation. It remained the only black school in Hampton until 1947, when Hampton Colored High School was built and the Hampton Colored School became the lunchroom for the high school.

The Hampton Colored School Museum and Resource Center is owned by the Town of Hampton and operated as a museum of area African American history.

It was listed on the National Register of Historic Places in 1991.

References

External links

Hampton Colored School Museum and Resource Center - Town of Hampton

African-American history of South Carolina
School buildings on the National Register of Historic Places in South Carolina
School buildings completed in 1929
National Register of Historic Places in Hampton County, South Carolina
Buildings and structures in Hampton County, South Carolina
Museums in Hampton County, South Carolina
African-American museums in South Carolina
1929 establishments in South Carolina